John Alford (born John James Shannon; 30 October 1971) is a British actor. He is known for his roles as Robbie Wright in the BBC series Grange Hill (1985–90) and Billy Ray in the ITV series London's Burning (1993–98). He also had three Top 30 hits on the UK Singles Chart in 1996.

Career
Born in Glasgow, Alford attended Anna Scher's stage school from age 11 in London, alongside future EastEnders actors Sid Owen and Patsy Palmer.

He appeared as a child actor in ITV sitcom Now and Then before landing the role of Robbie Wright in 1985 in Grange Hill. Alford featured on the Grange Hill "Just Say No" anti-drug single. In 1980, he appeared in Not the Nine O'Clock News, joining in a song about a strike-breaking train driver.

In 1993, prior to his solo singing career, he took his highest profile adult role as fireman Billy Ray in ITV's London's Burning, remaining in the role for five years. In 1996 this led to a short-lived singing career during which he released a self-titled album, but it did not chart. His first single release was "Smoke Gets in Your Eyes", which reached number 13 and stayed in the UK chart for five weeks. His highest hit was "Blue Moon"/"Only You", which reached number 9 in the UK charts and stayed in the UK chart for four weeks. A further single "If"/"Keep on Running", reached number 24 and stayed in the UK chart for three weeks. Alford's fourth and final single "Let It Be Me" was scheduled for release in March 1997, but was withdrawn at the last minute. Finished copies, some with 'promotional use only' stickers, exist. Alford was then dropped by his record label.

In 2001 he gained a role in the film Mike Bassett: England Manager. In 2003 he played the part of drug-dealing and scheming flight attendant Dean in Mile High.

In 2005 Alford appeared in the reality TV show Trust Me...I'm A Beauty Therapist, in which celebrities trained and worked in a salon doing hair and beauty. He has since appeared twice in Casualty, in May 2009 and May 2010, and was a prison guard in The Hatton Garden Job (2017).

Personal life
In 1999 he was convicted of supplying drugs to the News of the World undercover reporter Mazher Mahmood, and subsequently imprisoned for nine months. During his trial, Alford said in his defence that he was set up, and complained that Mahmood was not punished for this. He was released after six weeks after agreeing to electronic tagging. Alford has stated that Mahmood claimed to be a well-connected prince, who could offer Alford a lucrative contract.

After the collapse of the trial of Tulisa in 2014, when the judge said there were "strong grounds for believing" Mahmood had committed perjury, Alford told Panorama that the conviction had led him to suicidal thoughts. He was quoted as saying, "No one can give me the 18 years I’ve lost, no one can give me that back. I hope this is the first day of a new life for me."
 
In January 2006 Alford was found guilty of drink driving and subsequently banned from driving for sixteen months. Magistrates ordered him to pay a £150 fine and £100 costs.

On 1 October 2018 Alford appeared at Highbury Corner Magistrate's court where he pleaded not guilty to two counts of assault on a police officer and guilty to a charge of criminal damage to a vehicle belonging to Camden Council on 1 September 2018 in Holloway London. He was bailed to appear for trial at the same court on 29 November 2018. On 29 January 2019 Alford pleaded guilty to two counts of resisting an officer and was given a 12-month community order.

Discography

Studio albums

Singles

References

External links

1971 births
Living people
Male actors from Glasgow
Alumni of the Anna Scher Theatre School
20th-century Scottish male singers
British people convicted of drug offences
Anglo-Scots
Scottish male television actors